Terl Bryant is an English musician. His early career saw him working with US singer/songwriter and filmmaker Steve Taylor and later was in the band of Peter Murphy, the lead singer for Bauhaus. During the 90s he went on to join influential folk-themed progressive band Iona and in 1999 joined former Led Zeppelin bassist and multi-instrumentalist John Paul Jones as part of his trio with Chapman stick player Nick Beggs.

Biography
Bryant's website boasts a career spanning more than four decades, with a 1000 plus recording sessions and more than 50 world tours working with an extensive list of well known artists including Peter Gabriel, Matt Redman, Roddy Frame, Faith Hill, Maddy Prior, Louise Redknapp, Lulu, tobyMac, Barbara Dickson, Eden's Bridge, Patti Boulaye, Jim Kerr, Arthur Brown, Adrian Edmondson, Stuart Townend and others.

Between 2010 and 2015 Bryant regularly toured and recorded with Sadie and the Hotheads, an Americana styled band fronted by Downton Abbey actress and singer-songwriter Elizabeth McGovern. During 2014 Bryant performed with Adrian Edmondson and The Bad Shepherds.

Bryant is also known to perform and teach within Christian circles under the banner of 'Voice of Drums. In the mid-1990s Bryant formed "Psalm Drummers", a network gathering of drummers linked to the Christian faith. Bryant wrote and produced three albums released by Integrity Music (formerly Kingsway Music), Psalm Drummers (Emerge 2004), Drums of Hope (One Voice 2006) and Rhythms of Fire (One Voice 2007), and authored the book A Heart to Drum (Survivor books 2006). Bryant has held the drum and percussionist seat for UK singer-songwriter Graham Kendrick since 2008.

Discography
Solo
 Psalm (1995)
 Beauty... as far as the eye can see (1997) (marketed as Terl Bryant's Psalm: Beauty... as far as the Eye can see)
 Timbrel (1999)
 'Psalm Drummers (album/DVD) (2004)
 Rhythms of Fire (2007)
 Drums of Hope (album/DVD) (2008)
 More Gas (compilation) (2010)
 Ultimate Drums (loops and samples production tools) (2013) 
 Kaleidoscope (Bandcamp 2013)

With others
 Common Bond – Heaven Is Calling (1984)
 Darrell Mansfield – Revelation (1985)
 Steve Taylor – Limelight (1986)
 Terry Scott Taylor - Knowledge & Innocence (1986)
 Iona – Iona, The Book of Kells, Beyond These Shores, Treasures,  Journey into The Morn and Heaven's Bright Sun (1989–1998)
 Maddy Prior – Lionhearts, Arthur the King, Ravenchild (1997–1999)
 Michelle Collins – Sunburn (1997)
 Roddy Frame – North Star (1998)
 Louise – Woman in Me (1998)
 "Grief Never Grows Old" – Tsunami relief song with Brian Wilson, Steve Winwood, Sir Cliff Richard, Russell Watson, George Michael, Andy Gibb, Gary Moore, Davey Spillane
 Barbara Dickson – Nothing's Gonna Change My World (2003)
 Eden's Bridge – Celtic Series and Isle of Tides (2005), The Winter Sings (2010)
 Jules Bryant – Drops of Glittering Hope (produced by Terl Bryant, 2004)
 Peter Murphy – Love Hysteria, Deep, Holy Smoke (1986–1991)
 John Paul Jones – The Thunderthief (2001)
 6 Day Riot – Maybe (2006)
 Stefano Ianne – Piano Car (2010)
 Graham Kendrick – Acoustic Gospels (2010)
 Stuart Townend – The Journey (2011)
 Dani – Open Spaces (2011)
 Honeyz – Wonder No. 8
 Right Said Fred - Raining in England (2011), Mojive (2018)
 Elizabeth McGovern (Sadie and the Hotheads) How Not to Lose Things (2012), Still Waiting (2014), Little Drummer Boy (2014), The Truth (2019) 
 Leslie Garrett – A North Country Lass
 Stefano Ianne, Mario Marzi – Duga-3 (2018)
 Graham Kendrick - Keep The Banner Flying High (2019)
 Joanne Hogg - The Map Project 1 (2019)
 Arthur Brown (musician) - House of the Rising Sun (2020)
 Stefano Ianne, Mario Marzi - Les Belles Habitudes (2021)

Books
 A Heart to Drum (2006) - ISBN 1-84291-335-2

References

External links
 
 Iona discography page

Living people
English evangelicals
English drummers
British male drummers
British performers of Christian music
British percussionists
British folk rock musicians
Steeleye Span members
1961 births